Falkenstein or Falckenstein ("falcons' stone" in German) may refer to:

Places

Austria
 Falkenstein, Lower Austria, a market town in the district of Mistelbach

Germany
 Falkenstein, Bavaria, a market town in the district of Cham  
 Falkenstein, Rhineland-Palatinate, a municipality in Donnersbergkreis 
 Falkenstein, Saxony, a town in Vogtlandkreis 
 Falkenstein, Saxony-Anhalt, a town in Harz district 
 Falkenstein (Thuringia), a rock formation near Tambach-Dietharz in the Thuringian Forest
 Falkenstein, Königstein im Taunus, a small town north of Frankfurt am Main
 Großer Falkenstein, a mountain in the Bavarian Forest

Castles

Austria
 Falkenstein Castle (Lower Austria), a medieval ruin north of Vienna
 Falkenstein Castle (Niederfalkenstein), a preserved medieval castle in Carinthia
 Burgruine Falkenstein (Oberfalkenstein), a neighbouring ruined medieval castle in Carinthia

Czech Republic
 Falkenštejn Castle, a peak and medieval castle in Bohemian Switzerland

France
 Château du Falkenstein, a ruined castle in the commune of Philippsbourg in the Moselle département

Germany
 Falkenstein Castle (Bad Emstal), a ruin near Bad Emstal, Hesse
 Falkenstein Castle (Gerstetten), a ruin near Gerstetten in Heidenheim district of Baden-Württemberg
 Falkenstein Castle (Harz), a preserved medieval castle in the Harz mountains in Saxony-Anhalt
 Falkenstein Castle (Höllental), a ruin near Freiburg-im-Breisgau, Baden-Württemberg
 Falkenstein Castle (Palatinate), a ruin near Falkenstein on the Donnersberg in Rhineland-Palatinate
 Falkenstein Castle (Pfronten), a ruined castle near Pfronten, Bavaria
 Falkenstein (Saxon Switzerland), a peak and medieval castle in Saxon Switzerland
 Falkenstein Castle (Taunus), a ruined castle near Falkenstein, Hesse
 Old Falkenstein Castle (Alter Falkenstein or Alt-Falkenstein), a ruined castle in the Harz mountains near Falkenstein/Harz, Saxony-Anhalt
 , domiciles of Counts of Falkenstein in the Inn valley, Bavaria

Switzerland
 Alt-Falkenstein Castle, a ruin of a castle in Switzerland
 Neu-Falkenstein Castle, ruins near Balsthal (Klus) in Solothurn

Dynasties 
 Counts of Falkenstein (Bavaria), an extinct medieval dynasty in southern Bavaria
 Counts of Falkenstein (Rhineland-Palatinate)
 House of Falkenstein, a noble family from Baden-Württemberg

Other uses 
 Castle Falkenstein (role-playing game)

People with surname 
 Adam Falkenstein (1906–1966), German Assyriologist
 Claire Falkenstein (1908–1997), American sculptor
 Max Falkenstien (born 1924), longtime radio announcer for the Kansas Jayhawks and member of the Naismith Basketball Hall of Fame
Tony Falkenstein (1915–1994), American footballer
Tony Falkenstein (entrepreneur), New Zealand philanthropist
 Eduard Vogel von Falckenstein (1797–1885), Prussian general
 Maximilian Vogel von Falckenstein (1839–1917), Prussian general
 Waldeen Falkenstein (1913–1993), American dancer and choreographer